The Jiemian Dam is a concrete-face rock-fill dam on the Junxi River in Youxi County of Fujian Province, China. The primary purpose of the dam is hydroelectric power generation and it supports a 300 MW power station. Construction on the dam began in 2002, the reservoir was impounded by 17 February 2007 and on 28 November 2007, the first 150 MW generator was commissioned. The second was commissioned in 2008.

See also

List of dams and reservoirs in China
List of tallest dams in China

References

Dams in China
Concrete-face rock-fill dams
Dams completed in 2007
Energy infrastructure completed in 2008
Hydroelectric power stations in Fujian